Aubrey Ferreira (born 15 October 1994) is a South African cricketer. He made his first-class debut for Eastern Province in the 2017–18 Sunfoil 3-Day Cup on 12 October 2017.

In September 2018, he was named in Mpumalanga's squad for the 2018 Africa T20 Cup. He was the leading run-scorer for Mpumalanga in the tournament, with 120 runs in four matches.

References

External links
 

1994 births
Living people
South African cricketers
Place of birth missing (living people)
Eastern Province cricketers
Mpumalanga cricketers